The Convention Concerning Customs Facilities for Touring is a 1954 United Nations multilateral treaty. In states that adhere to the Convention, it allows tourists to import personal effects into the country duty free so long as the effects are for the personal use of the tourist and they are carried on the person or in their luggage.

Content
The Convention states that "personal effects" includes the following items:

The Convention also permits the duty-free exportation of travel souvenirs for a total value not exceeding US$100. A "tourist" is defined in the Convention as "any person without distinction as to race, sex, language, religion, who enters the territory of a Contracting State other than that in which that person normally resides and remains there for not less than twenty-four hours and not more than six months in the course of any twelve-month period, for legitimate non-immigrant purposes, such as touring, recreation, sports, health, family reasons, study, religious pilgrimages or business".

Creation and ratification
The Convention was concluded in New York City on 4 June 1954 at the same conference that the Customs Convention on the Temporary Importation of Private Road Vehicles was concluded. It was signed by 32 states and entered into force on 11 September 1957. As of 2013, 79 states have ratified the treaty. The states that have signed but not ratified the Convention are Dominican Republic, Guatemala, Holy See, Honduras, Monaco, and Panama. Singapore ratified the Convention in 1966 but denounced it in 1999, with effect from 2001.

Subsequent developments
The Convention was somewhat superseded in 1990 by the Istanbul Convention, which combines in one single instrument the various conventions on the temporary admission of specific goods.

See also
ATA Carnet
Text
Ratifications

1954 in New York City
1954 in transport
Customs treaties
Transport treaties
Treaties concluded in 1954
Treaties entered into force in 1957
Tourism treaties
United Nations treaties
Treaties of Albania
Treaties of Algeria
Treaties of Argentina
Treaties of Australia
Treaties of Austria
Treaties of Barbados
Treaties of Belgium
Treaties of Bosnia and Herzegovina
Treaties of the People's Republic of Bulgaria
Treaties of the Kingdom of Cambodia (1953–1970)
Treaties of Canada
Treaties of the Central African Republic
Treaties of Chile
Treaties of Costa Rica
Treaties of Croatia
Treaties of Cuba
Treaties of Cyprus
Treaties of Denmark
Treaties of Ecuador
Treaties of the Republic of Egypt (1953–1958)
Treaties of El Salvador
Treaties of Fiji
Treaties of Finland
Treaties of France
Treaties of West Germany
Treaties of Ghana
Treaties of Greece
Treaties of Haiti
Treaties of the Hungarian People's Republic
Treaties of India
Treaties of Pahlavi Iran
Treaties of Ireland
Treaties of Israel
Treaties of Italy
Treaties of Jamaica
Treaties of Japan
Treaties of Jordan
Treaties of Lebanon
Treaties of Liberia
Treaties of Lithuania
Treaties of Luxembourg
Treaties of the Federation of Malaya
Treaties of Mali
Treaties of Malta
Treaties of Mauritius
Treaties of Mexico
Treaties of Montenegro
Treaties of Morocco
Treaties of Nepal
Treaties of the Netherlands
Treaties of New Zealand
Treaties of Nigeria
Treaties of Norway
Treaties of Peru
Treaties of the Philippines
Treaties of the Polish People's Republic
Treaties of the Estado Novo (Portugal)
Treaties of the Socialist Republic of Romania
Treaties of the Soviet Union
Treaties of Rwanda
Treaties of Senegal
Treaties of Serbia and Montenegro
Treaties of Sierra Leone
Treaties of Slovenia
Treaties of the Solomon Islands
Treaties of Francoist Spain
Treaties of the Dominion of Ceylon
Treaties of Sweden
Treaties of Switzerland
Treaties of the United Arab Republic
Treaties of Tonga
Treaties of Trinidad and Tobago
Treaties of Tunisia
Treaties of Turkey
Treaties of Uganda
Treaties of the United Kingdom
Treaties of Tanzania
Treaties of the United States
Treaties of Uruguay
Treaties of South Vietnam
Treaties of Yugoslavia
Treaties extended to the Faroe Islands
Treaties extended to Greenland
Treaties extended to West Berlin
Treaties extended to Liechtenstein
Treaties extended to the Belgian Congo
Treaties extended to Ruanda-Urundi
Treaties extended to the Netherlands Antilles
Treaties extended to Aruba
Treaties extended to Netherlands New Guinea
Treaties extended to Surinam (Dutch colony)
Treaties extended to the Cook Islands
Treaties extended to Niue
Treaties extended to Portuguese Angola
Treaties extended to Portuguese Guinea
Treaties extended to Portuguese Macau
Treaties extended to Portuguese Mozambique
Treaties extended to Portuguese Timor
Treaties extended to the Colony of North Borneo
Treaties extended to British Cyprus
Treaties extended to the Colony of Fiji
Treaties extended to the Colony of Jamaica
Treaties extended to the Federation of Malaya
Treaties extended to the Crown Colony of Seychelles
Treaties extended to the Colony of Sierra Leone
Treaties extended to the Crown Colony of Singapore
Treaties extended to British Somaliland
Treaties extended to the Kingdom of Tonga (1900–1970)
Treaties extended to the Sultanate of Zanzibar
Treaties extended to the Crown Colony of Malta
Treaties extended to the West Indies Federation
Treaties extended to Brunei (protectorate)
Treaties extended to British Mauritius
Treaties extended to the Colony of Sarawak
Treaties extended to Bermuda
Treaties extended to the Gambia Colony and Protectorate
Treaties extended to the Colony and Protectorate of Nigeria
Treaties extended to the British Solomon Islands
Treaties extended to Gibraltar
Treaties extended to Saint Helena, Ascension and Tristan da Cunha
Treaties extended to British Kenya
Treaties extended to the Uganda Protectorate
Treaties extended to Tanganyika (territory)
Treaties extended to British Honduras
Treaties extended to British Hong Kong
Treaties extended to British Guiana
Treaties extended to the Territory of Alaska
Treaties extended to the Territory of Hawaii
Treaties extended to Puerto Rico
Treaties extended to the United States Virgin Islands